"Pop Goes the World" is a song by Canadian new wave and synthpop band Men Without Hats. It was released in October 1987 as the lead single from their third studio album of the same name. The song reached  1 in Austria, No. 2 in Canada, and No. 3 in South Africa. It was originally written as an electronic instrumental. The song has been inducted into the Canadian Songwriters Hall of Fame.

Content
The song tells the story of "Johnny" and "Jenny", the two members of a musical group called "The Human Race" on their quest for fame in the industry. However, at one point the lyrics note that they come to the realization that they could make "more money on a movie screen". The members' instruments of choice vary throughout the song, though Johnny is primarily a guitarist and Jenny is a bassist.

Music video
The music video for the song features lead singer Ivan Doroschuk who tells the story of "Johnny," played by guitarist Stefan Doroschuk (impersonating Elvis Presley), and "Jenny", portrayed by an unknown actress playing a left-handed Höfner 500/1 bass. The two are seen dancing around a bubble-filled stage along with numerous other characters including a keyboard-playing baby and Bonhomme. The word "Pop!", in writing reminiscent of a comic book, appears periodically on-screen in time with popping noises that punctuate the song. The video was released in 1988 in the CD Video format.

Personnel
 Ivan Doroschuk – vocals, guitar, keyboards, drum programming
 Stefan Doroschuk – backing vocals, bass

Charts

Weekly charts

Year-end charts

Certifications

2012 version
The song was re-recorded during the Love in the Age of War sessions, with Ivan Doroschuk on vocals, James Love on guitar and bass, and Louise Dawson on keyboards and drum programming. The recording was released as a digital single in 2012.

In popular culture
The song was featured in the 1987 film Date with an Angel, which starred Phoebe Cates, Emmanuelle Béart and Michael E. Knight. The song was also featured very briefly in the 1991 film Scanners II: The New Order.

The song was used by Tide in TV advertisements for their "Pods" in 2012. The opening riff of the song was also utilized in the promotional advertising for the American television series Young Sheldon in the summer of 2017.

Football teams in several countries use versions of the song as chants:
In Argentina, Paraguay, and Ecuador, it is used by several teams and is arguably the most popular tune sung by fans.
In Japan, it is used by the national team and Yokohama F. Marinos.
In Brazil, it is used by Sport Club Internacional.
In Hungary, fans of Diósgyőr use the song with the lyrics: "Amíg élek én, nem érdekel más, csak a Diósgyőr, csak a Diósgyőr, csak a Diósgyőr!" ("As long as I live, I don't care about anything but Diósgyőr, only Diósgyőr, only Diósgyőr!").
In Israel, fans of Hapoel Tel Aviv sing the song with the lyrics: "הפועל עולה" ("Hapoel goes up").

In the 2019 Chilean protests against the Chilean government, protesters created the song "Chile Despertó" ("Chile Woke Up"), using the melody of "Pop Goes the World".

Since December 2015, the song has also been very popular in Argentina as an anthem of former President Cristina Fernández de Kirchner's followers; who sing "Oooh, Vamos a volver, a Volver a Volver, Vamos a Volver" ("Oooh, we will return, we'll return, we'll return, we will return").

Notes

References

Men Without Hats songs
1987 singles
1987 songs
Mercury Records singles
Number-one singles in Austria